Duncan Forestar of Torwood and Skipinch was a Scottish courtier and financial administrator. He also served as Provost of Stirling.

His family home was Torwood Castle near Stirling. "Skipinch" was an alternative name for Skipness Castle. James IV of Scotland gave him a barony of the lands of Skipness and the keepership of the castle on 3 July 1495.

Duncan Forestar was also called "of Garden", from another property near Stirling. Alexander Forrester of Garden was a member of a later generation of the same family.

He was Comptroller of Scotland from 1492 to 1499 and from 1508 to 1509, serving James IV of Scotland. The Comptroller was in charge of collecting and spending royal revenue. In 1508 he was "Great Purveyor to the Queen" or "Magnus Provisor", in charge of purchasing food and other items for the household of Margaret Tudor, the wife of James IV. For a time there were separate household accounts for Margaret Tudor, but these records do not now survive.

His accounts written in Latin mention royal servants, including the king's tailor John Steel, his barber James Jacklin, and the master cook Thomas Schaw. Some expenses were met for the Spanish ambassador Pedro de Ayala, and details are given of Perkin Warbeck (called the Duke of York) and the raids in England to Norham Castle and Heaton Castle.

References

Comptrollers of Scotland
Household of Margaret Tudor
Court of James IV of Scotland
Monarchy and money